

External links

 01
churches
Churches, Bern
Bern
Chur
.01